Irving Melvin Stern (November 6, 1928 – February 3, 2023) was an American politician in the state of Minnesota. He served in the Minnesota Senate from 1979 to 1982 as a Minnesota Democratic–Farmer–Labor Party member, representing district 41.  Stern previously served as mayor of St. Louis Park, Minnesota from 1977 to 1979.

Stern died in Yuma, Arizona, on February 3, 2023, at the age of 94.

References

1928 births
2023 deaths
Politicians from Milwaukee
People from St. Louis Park, Minnesota
Roosevelt University alumni
Businesspeople from Minnesota
Democratic Party Minnesota state senators
Mayors of places in Minnesota